Robert Watkins "Bert" Yeabsley (December 17, 1893 – February 8, 1961) was a professional baseball player. Yeabsley played in Major League Baseball for Philadelphia Phillies in the 1919 season. He only played in three games in his one-year major league career, not having an at bat in any of them.

In 1916, Yeabsley played minor league baseball for the Raleigh Capitals as an outfielder. He made his major league debut on May 28, 1919. He pinch-hit for pitcher Elmer Jacobs in the 9th inning and drew a walk off Jimmy Ring of the Cincinnati Reds. Over the next two weeks, he appeared in two more games as a pinch runner, and never played professional baseball afterwards.

Yeabsley also played professional football from 1914 until 1919 for the Conshohocken Athletic Club. In 1919, he played football for the Holmesburg Athletic Club.

He was born and died in Philadelphia, Pennsylvania.

External links

Ghosts of the Gridiron:Conshohocken Athletic Club
Holmesburg Athletic Club Philadelphia Athletic Champs 1919 & 1920

Baseball outfielders
Philadelphia Phillies players
Raleigh Capitals players
Conshohocken Athletic Club players
Holmesburg Athletic Club players
Baseball players from Pennsylvania
Players of American football from Pennsylvania
1893 births
1961 deaths